James Gresham (b Fulham 1617 – d Haslemere 1689) was an English politician in the second half of the 17th century.

Gresham came to live in Haslemere in 1650.  He was called to the bar in 1652.  He became a JP in 1660 and in 1676 he presented an almshouse to the town.

References

People from Fulham
1617 births
1689 deaths
English MPs 1679
English MPs 1661–1679
17th-century English people